Arne Bergodd (born 16 August 1948) is a Norwegian competition rower and Olympic medalist.

He received a silver medal in coxless fours at the 1976 Summer Olympics in Montreal, together with Finn Tveter, Rolf Andreassen, and Ole Nafstad.

References

External links

1948 births
Living people
Norwegian male rowers
Olympic rowers of Norway
Olympic silver medalists for Norway
Rowers at the 1972 Summer Olympics
Rowers at the 1976 Summer Olympics
Sportspeople from Drammen
Olympic medalists in rowing
Medalists at the 1976 Summer Olympics
European Rowing Championships medalists